Joanna Elizabeth Dunham (6 May 1936 – 25 November 2014) was an English actress, best noted for her work on stage and television. She also appeared in several major films.

Career
Dunham was born in Luton, Bedfordshire, the daughter of Peter Browning Dunham (1911–1997), an architect and artist, and Constance Amy Margareta (1911-1992; née Young). Her father's aunt was the Impressionist painter Amy Katherine Browning, who married the artist Thomas Cantrell Dugdale.

Dunham was educated at Bedales School, then the Slade School of Art, and in 1956 she attended RADA, the Royal Academy of Dramatic Art, the same year as Susannah York and Brian Epstein, who later became the manager of the Beatles.

Dunham first gained notice for playing Juliet in the 1962 Old Vic production of Romeo and Juliet, under the direction of Franco Zeffirelli, which was performed in a five-month, 13-city U.S. tour. She was spotted by Marilyn Monroe, who recommended her to director George Stevens for the role of Mary Magdalen in The Greatest Story Ever Told (1965).

Her first television role had come some years earlier (1958), when she appeared as Louka in the "Arms and the Man" episode of BBC Sunday Night Theatre. As of 1998 Dunham had appeared in at least 45 different television series or productions.

Filmography
Dunham had credited roles in at least seven films:
The Breaking Point (1961) - Cherry Winlatter
Dangerous Afternoon (1961) - Freda
The Greatest Story Ever Told (1965) - Mary Magdalene
A Day at the Beach (1970) - Tonie
The House That Dripped Blood (1971) - Alice Hillyer
Scandal (1989) - Lady Bronwen Astor
The Hour of the Pig (1993) - Lady Catherine d/Auferre

While working on The Greatest Story Ever Told, the on-site filming of which stretched to over a year, Dunham announced that she was pregnant. Director George Stevens tried to keep her in the production with the use of flattering camera angles and draped costumes. He told an interviewer from Variety, "Well, that Mary Magdalene always was a troublemaker."

Television
She appeared as William Tell's sister-in-law, Gretel, in The Adventures of William Tell, notably in "The Shrew" episode (1958).

In 1972, Dunham appeared in an episode of Sykes (series 1, episode 11 – "Dreams") as Sykes' doctor.

In 1973, Dunham was featured as Penny Burns in an episode of the Thriller entitled, Possession.

In 1974 she appeared in a two part episode of the soap opera 'Rooms' for Thames Television, opposite Ray Brooks.

In 1976, she appeared as a guest artist in an episode of Space 1999 entitled Missing Link, she played the character Vana. She appeared as Arlette van der Valk in the third series of Van der Valk (1977), as Alice Rhodes in an episode of Wicked Women (1970), and as Miss Featherstone in the episode "Goodbye Mrs. Slocombe" in the 10th series of Are You Being Served (1984). She was Jean Gayton in Casting the Runes (1979) for ITV.

Personal life
Dunham was married twice, to Henry A. Osborne (1961–72, ended in divorce) and to Reggie Oliver (1992-her death). She took up painting when her acting career declined, and converted a Suffolk farm building into an art gallery.

Death
Dunham died on 25 November 2014, aged 78.

References

External links

1936 births
2014 deaths
Actors from Luton
Actresses from Bedfordshire
Alumni of RADA
Alumni of the Slade School of Fine Art
English film actresses
English stage actresses
People educated at Bedales School
Place of death missing